Luis Sarría (born 8 May 1949) is a Spanish sprinter. He competed in the 4 × 100 metres relay at the 1972 Summer Olympics and the 1976 Summer Olympics.

References

1949 births
Living people
Athletes (track and field) at the 1972 Summer Olympics
Athletes (track and field) at the 1976 Summer Olympics
Spanish male sprinters
Olympic athletes of Spain
Place of birth missing (living people)